There were 40 known prisoner-of-war camps across Canada during World War II, although this number also includes internment camps that held Canadians of German and Japanese descent. Several reliable sources indicate that there were only 25 or 26 camps holding exclusively prisoners from foreign countries, nearly all from Germany.

The camps were identified by letters at first, then by numbers. In addition to the main camps there were branch camps and labour camps. The prisoners were given various tasks; many worked in the forests as logging crews or on nearby farms; they were paid a nominal amount for their labour.  Approximately 11,000 were thus employed by 1945.

The largest number of military prisoners of war was recorded as 33,798 by several sources. In addition to POWs, some civilian internees were held in the camps and some estimates include such prisoners.

All POWs were protected by the conditions of the Geneva Convention. There are claims that conditions in the Canadian camps tended to be better than average, and many times better than the conditions of the barracks that Canadian troops were kept in. They were guarded by the Veterans Guard of Canada, mostly men who had been soldiers during WW I. It is believed by some that the lenient treatment foiled many escape attempts before they even started. It is told that a group of German prisoners returned to Ozada camp after escaping because of encountering a grizzly bear. Starting in 1945, all POWs were released and returned to their home countries. None were allowed to remain in Canada, but some later returned as immigrants.

See also
List of World War I prisoner-of-war camps in Canada
Lac Saint-Jean

References

External links
Truro Daily

Canada
POW camps